The Catford Loop Line is a railway line in southeast London. It carries a suburban stopping passenger service from central London to Sevenoaks, and is also a relief route for the Chatham Main Line carrying passenger trains from London Victoria to the Kent coast. There is also much freight activity as this is the main route to Willesden and the north via Latchmere Junction. Freight traffic includes aggregates trains to and from locations along the Thames estuary, and Kent, aviation fuel running between Colnbrook (for Heathrow) and the Isle of Grain, and a small number of international workings from the Channel Tunnel via the yard at Dollands Moor. Until around 2013, a significant quantity of intermodal traffic from Thamesport used the line - however, the opening of London Gateway meant that the larger container ships stopped serving Thamesport and this traffic then ceased.

The line begins at Brixton Junction, where it diverges from the Chatham Main line, and ends when it rejoins the Chatham Main Line (now extended to pairs of fast and slow lines) at Shortlands Junction, west of  station.

Stations
  (platforms closed 1916)

History
Incorporated as the Shortlands and Nunhead Railway in 1889 it was opened by the London, Chatham and Dover Railway on 1 July 1892. 

The five stations on the original route were:
 
 
 
 
 

The length of the Catford Loop is nearly eight miles (12.5 km).

The line was electrified with the other SECR urban routes on 12 July 1925 by the Southern Railway on its 660 DC third-rail system.

As of 12 January 2015, Southeastern operates an hourly service from London Victoria to Dover Priory over the line; Denmark Hill is the only station on the line called at by this service.   All other services originate from London Blackfriars and Thameslink Core and call at all stations.

Services
The service in June 2022 is:

Off-peak / Weekends:
2tph London Blackfriars via Elephant and Castle
2tph Kentish Town via Elephant and Castle (currently suspended)
1tph London Victoria (calling only at Denmark Hill)
2tph Sevenoaks via Swanley
2tph Orpington (currently suspended)
1tph Gillingham via Chatham (calling only at Denmark Hill)

Peak
2tph Welwyn Garden City via Elephant and Castle
2tph Luton via London Blackfriars
2tph London Victoria (calling only at Denmark Hill)
2tph Sevenoaks via Swanley
2tph Orpington
2tph Gillingham via Chatham (calling only at Denmark Hill + some at Crofton Park and Bellingham)

References 

Transport in the London Borough of Bromley
Transport in the London Borough of Lambeth
Transport in the London Borough of Lewisham
Transport in the London Borough of Southwark
Railway loop lines
Railway lines in London
Railway lines opened in 1892
Standard gauge railways in London